Moisés Manuel Acuña Morales (born 23 July 1996) is a Venezuelan footballer who plays as a defender for Aragua F.C. in the Venezuelan Primera División.

Career

Caracas
Acuña began his senior career with Caracas, making his Venezuelan Primera División debut on 4 October 2015 in a 3–0 victory over Estudiantes de Mérida. Following the 2018 season, his contract was terminated by the club.

References

External links

1996 births
Living people
Caracas FC players
Aragua FC players
Venezuelan Primera División players
Venezuelan footballers
Association football defenders
People from Maturín
21st-century Venezuelan people